Bambusa affinis is a species of Bambusa bamboo, and a member of the grass family.

Description 
The perennial plant can grow to 500–600 cm long and the stem can go up to 25–35 mm diameter.

Distribution 
It can be found in the tropical regions of Indo-China.

References 

affinis
Flora of Indo-China